Danny Perez is a former Major League Baseball outfielder. Perez was drafted by the Milwaukee Brewers in the twenty-first round of the 1992 Major League Baseball Draft. He played at the Major League level with the team in 1996.

Perez played at the collegiate level at Oklahoma State University.

References

People from El Paso, Texas
Milwaukee Brewers players
Major League Baseball outfielders
Oklahoma State Cowboys baseball players
1971 births
Living people
Baseball players from Texas
Newburgh Black Diamonds players
Atlantic City Surf players
Lehigh Valley Black Diamonds players
Aberdeen Arsenal players
Sioux City Explorers players
Beloit Brewers players
Bowie Baysox players
El Paso Diablos players
Helena Brewers players
New Orleans Zephyrs players
Stockton Ports players